BBC Radio 1Xtra is a British digital radio station owned and operated by the BBC. It broadcasts black music and urban music, including hip hop and R&B and is a sister station to Radio 1. Launching at 18:00 on 16 August 2002, it had been code named "Network X" during the consultation period. At the time, the station was listed as "1 Xtra BBC" on many electronic programming guides.  The station broadcasts from the 8th floor of Broadcasting House, shared with Radio 1 and the Asian Network.

According to RAJAR, the station broadcasts to a weekly audience of 756,000 with a listening share of 0.3% as of December 2022.

Music policy
BBC Radio 1Xtra's music includes largely British, North American, Caribbean and African hip hop, grime, bassline,  UK garage, dubstep, drum and bass, UK funky, house, dancehall, soca, reggae, gospel music, bhangra, soul, and R&B. It is available on digital radio (DAB), digital satellite television, digital terrestrial television (Freeview), and the Internet. The first ever track played on 1Xtra was a specially created track produced by DJ Skitz and Rodney P and featuring Beverley Knight and Blak Twang. The five-hour show was presented by the Rampage DJ collective and the station's then breakfast show host, KC.

News and speech
As part of its public service broadcasting remit, 1Xtra is required to carry a significant amount of news, information and speech content. 1Xtra had its own news service, 1Xtra News (formerly known as "TX"), which was operated as a subsidiary of Radio 1's Newsbeat operations. The tone and style of the news presentation is in keeping with the station's overall target audience - young and predominantly urban.

Initially, in addition to regular hourly bulletins, TX had a flagship weekday two-hour news, features and discussion show under the title "TX Unltd" (pronounced "Unlimited"). This show - initially broadcast in a 5pm7pm slot - rated poorly, however, and was later absorbed into a mixed music-and-speech format (similar to that used by Jeremy Vine on Radio 2) which aired in mid-afternoon (2pm4pm) and was named after its host, Max.

In 2009, the BBC Trust agreed to a further change to the scheduling of news content on 1Xtra, such that it could use the same format successfully operated by Radio 1's Newsbeat: two 15-minute news bulletins, one in the middle of the day and another in the early evening, with other speech features, profiles and social/cultural specials being broadcast on an ad hoc basis within music-led shows, and with regular hourly news bulletins also continuing. The Trust required that 1Xtra's main bulletins not air at the same time as those on Radio 1. When the new bulletins were introduced in late summer 2009, they aired at noon and 5pm, with Radio 1's bulletins remaining at 12:45pm and 5:45pm.

As of Summer 2009 it was reported that Radio 1 and 1Xtra were carrying shared news bulletins at weekends; weekday news output remained separate.

September 2012 saw a substantial increase in Newsbeat bulletins simulcast with Radio 1. Weekday breakfast bulletins at 6am, 7.30am, 8am, 8.30am and 9.30am remain bespoke 1Xtra broadcasts. From 10:30am, bulletins are shared with Radio 1, including the 15-minute Newsbeat magazines at 12:45pm and 5:45pm.

In the first quarter of 2011, 1Xtra was part of an efficiency review conducted by John Myers. His role, according to Andrew Harrison, the chief executive of RadioCentre, was "to identify both areas of best practice and possible savings."

In November 2017, reports signalled that the Roundhouse Rising concert series would partner with 1Xtra. As part of the change, the BBC curated a free grime night in the venue's Sackler Space.

Audience profile

BBC Radio 1Xtra's typical audience is between fifteen and thirty years old.

According to the "Submission to the Secretary of State's review of digital channels" in March 2004, Radio 1Xtra "provides music output 24 hours a day, punctuated by bespoke BBC news bulletins and other speech output designed specifically to be pertinent to the audience."

Notable presenters

Current notable presenters

 Kenny Allstar
 Benji B
 Nick Bright
 Tiffany Calver
 Eddie Kadi
 Nadia Jae
 Trevor Nelson
 David Rodigan
 Snoochie Shy
 Sir Spyro
 DJ Target
 Heartless Crew

Weekday evening shows began with MistaJam helming a three-hour multi-genre show, followed by six hours of specialist output tailored to a particular genre (e.g. UK Garage, dancehall, etc.) Between October 2009 and spring 2010, the 4am6am slot housed a replay of selected weekend specialist programming; this and the one-hour Morning Mix programme were dropped in spring 2010 and a new six-days-a-week 'early breakfast' show (4am7am) hosted by Nick Bright was introduced. (The Saturday 4am replay of Target's Friday night show was also axed, to make room for Bright's sixth show) This has now itself been replaced by a rerun of the previous week's overnight mix show from 4am to 6am, giving nine hours of specialist output.

Weekday overnights (1am3am), Saturday overnights (1am4am) and Saturday evenings (7pm1am) are now simulcast entirely with Radio 1 - this allows Radio 1's flagship urban content to air on 1Xtra.

Former notable presenters

 A. Dot
 Clara Amfo
 Adele Roberts
 Sarah-Jane Crawford
 Gemma Cairney
 Reggie Yates
 Ronnie Herel
 DJ Cameo
 Devin Griffin
 Kelly Rowland
 Ms. Dynamite
 Djsky
 Zena McNally
 Tim Westwood
 Crissy Criss
 DJ Blakey
 Matthew Xia
 DJ Q
 Rodney P
 DJ Skitz
 Ras Kwame
 Robbo Ranx
 Friction
 Panjabi Hit Squad
 Semtex
 Charlie Sloth
 MistaJam
 Toddla T
 Diplo
 René LaVice
 Annie Nightingale
 Yasmin Evans
 Cuppy
 Lady Leshurr

Logo history

References

Sources

External links

1Xtra
Urban contemporary radio stations
Black British music
Radio stations established in 2002
2002 establishments in the United Kingdom
Radio stations in the United Kingdom
Digital-only radio stations